Don Quichotte chez la Duchesse (Don Quixote at the Duchess) is a "comic ballet" (comédie lyrique) by the French baroque composer Joseph Bodin de Boismortier. Although it is described as a ballet, it is sung throughout with a libretto by Charles Simon Favart.

Performance history
It was first performed on 12 February 1743 at the Académie Royale de Musique et de Dance in Paris.

Roles
Don Quichotte, haute-contre Jean-Antoine Bérard
Sancho Pança, taille (baritenor) Louis-Antoine Cuvilliers
Altisidore, soprano Marie Fel
Peasant girl, soprano Mlle Bourbonnois
Woman, soprano
Duke, bass
Merlin, basse-taille (bass-baritone) Person
Montésinos, basse-taille Albert
Japanese man, basse-taille Person
Japanese woman, soprano Marie Fel
Enchanted lovers, sopranos Mlles Clairon and Gondré
Ballerinas, Marie Anne de Cupis de Camargo and Mimi Dallemand
Male dancers, David Dumoulin, Louis Dupré and Jean-Barthélemy Lany

Synopsis
The opera is based upon an episode in the Cervantes novel Don Quixote, in which a Duke and Duchess amuse themselves by creating an elaborate ruse to fool the title character.

Discography
 Don Quichotte chez la la Duchesse (Comic Ballet in Three Acts), by Joseph Bodin de Boismortier. Hervé Niquet (conductor) and the ensemble Le Concert Spirituel; Naxos 8.553647 (1996).

See also

Baroque dance

References
 Pitou, Spire, The Paris Opéra. An Encyclopedia of Operas, Ballets, Composers, and Performers – Rococo and Romantic, 1715-1815, Greenwood Press, Westport/London, 1985 (article: "Don Quichotte chez la Duchesse", p. 168), 
 
 Le magazine de l'opéra baroque, accessed 2 April 2010

Operas based on Don Quixote
French-language operas
Operas by Joseph Bodin de Boismortier
Operas
1743 operas
Ballets by Joseph Bodin de Boismortier
Ballets by Charles Simon Favart